Ebela (Bengali: এবেলা) was a Bengali tabloid targeted primarily at young Bengali readers of West Bengal. It is the second Bengali daily published by ABP Group after Anandabazar Patrika. This is a 24-page tabloid was being circulated in Kolkata and Howrah only. The newspaper was discontinued on 17 December 2018.

Sections 
 Ebela, the main section of the newspaper, covering the latest news of West Bengal, India and the world
 Obela covers topics related to entertainment, film, music, city festivals, and television schedules 
 Rabibela, a special section of Sunday editions (discontinued)

See also 
 Ei Samay

References

External links 
  

Bengali-language newspapers published in India
Newspapers published in Kolkata
ABP Group
Companies based in Kolkata
2012 establishments in West Bengal
2018 disestablishments in India
Newspapers established in 2012